Shark River may refer to:

Rivers
Shark River (Florida), U.S.
Shark River (New Jersey), U.S.
Shark River (Trinidad), a river of Trinidad and Tobago

Other uses
Shark River (film), a 1953 American film